General elections were held in Sweden between 15 and 21 September 1928. The Swedish Social Democratic Party remained the largest party, winning 90 of the 230 seats in the Andra kammaren of the Riksdag. Arvid Lindman of the General Electoral League became Prime Minister, replacing the incumbent, Carl Gustaf Ekman of the Free-minded National Association. The elections have since become known as the "Cossack Election" due to the harsh tone and aggressive criticism used by both sides.

Results

References

External links

General elections in Sweden
Sweden
General
Sweden